Catalunya Ràdio is Catalonia's public radio network. With headquarters in Barcelona, it is part of the Corporació Catalana de Mitjans Audiovisuals (CCMA), owned by the Generalitat de Catalunya.

Catalunya Ràdio broadcasts exclusively in Catalan and is the major Catalan-language network today, although Ràdio 4 from Radio Nacional de España (founded in 1976) was the first post-Franco Era station to broadcast in the language.

Stations
Catalunya Ràdio began broadcasting on 20 June 1983. Over the years, it has expanded to encompass four separate stations:
 Catalunya Ràdio – The first station, and the one that gave the network its name. A generalist station that broadcasts 24 hours a day and is the third largest radio station in Catalonia by audience size.
 Catalunya Música – Founded on 10 May 1987, Catalunya Música concentrates on classical and contemporary music, plus specialized music programmes. It broadcasts 24 hours a day.
 Catalunya Informació – Created on 11 September 1992, Catalunya Informació was Spain's first all-news station. It broadcasts 24 hours a day.
 iCat (formerly iCat FM and iCat.cat) – Launched on 23 April 2006, this a multi-media radio station closely linked to the Internet and promoting both traditional and contemporary culture.

Catalunya Ràdio has grown significantly since its inception, and is currently available in Catalonia, Valencia, the Balearic Islands, Northern Catalonia, La Franja, and Andorra.

Former stations
 RAC 105 – Station dedicated to musical successes; first broadcast February 15, 1984. It was born with the name of RAC (Ràdio Associació de Catalunya) in 1984. It ceased to be part of the CCRTV in 1998.
 Catalunya Cultura – Cultural station with varied topics. Broadcast from February 2, 1999 to April 23, 2006. It was replaced by iCat.
 Catalunya Clàssica – A station dedicated to classical music by Catalan authors. Broadcast from February 18, 2008 to 2019.

Main programs

Catalunya Ràdio 
Programs here is dedicated to news, magazines and entertainment.

 Alguna pregunta més?
 Amb mal peu
 Catalunya Migdia
 Catalunya Vespre
 El Cafè de la República
 El lloro, el moro, el mico i el senyor de Puerto Rico
 El matí de Josep Cuní
 El suplement
 Els optimistes
 En guàrdia
 Generació digital
 L'internauta
 L'ofici de viure
 L'orquestra
 La transmissió d'en Puyal
 La tribu de Catalunya Ràdio
 El matí de Catalunya Ràdio
 Les mil i una nits de Maria de la Pau Janer
 La nit dels ignorants
 El secret
 Tarda Tardà
 Tot gira
 Els viatgers de la Gran Anaconda

Catalunya Informació  
As Spain's first all-news station, Catalunya Informació has a strong focus on local news, traffic, weather and information. News bulletins is aired around the clock. At the half past, the station will summary what have been said in 30 minutes ago and what will be said in 30 minutes next. At :33, Catalunya Informació tells listeners the day's three most important news, also local traffic updates from Catalunya Transit Service and the latest weather forecasts for the coming hours at :15 and :45. Weather summaries can also be heard during the headlines.

The station's hourly news block is as follows: 

 at :00 – Headlines
 at :03 – News
 at :15 – Traffic and Weather
 at :18 – News
 at :25 – Sports
 at :30 – Summary and content next half-hour
 at :33 – The day's three most important news
 at :40 – Details of the day's three most important news, plus news that wasn't told at :00
 at :45 – Traffic and Weather
 at :48 – News
 at :55 – Sports

Traffic updates are only broadcast between 6:30 and 22:30 (also on headlines during rush hours). This 60-minute format has been used since 7 April 2015, at 12:00. When a local event is happening, the station will interrupt this news wheel to provide continuous coverage of that event.

Catalunya Música 
Música is focused on local songs, music festivals, and music historical sites.

 Preludi
 Tonalitats
 La setmana de...
 Els concerts
 Només hi faltes tu
 Notes de clàssica
 Els gustos reunits
 Guia d'orquestra
 El violí vermell
 El Gran Segle
 Una tarda a l'òpera
 Qui té por del segle XX?
 Espais Oberts
 Via Jazz
 Històries de l'òpera
 Solistes
 Blog de nit

iCat 
Here, with music, it also keeps a watchful eye on culture. This station previously operated a number of specialized, online-only, sister stations:  TotCat (local music), MusiCatles which was replaced by iCat Món (world music), Mediterràdio (Mediterranean music and culture), iCat Jazz (jazz), iCat Rumba (Catalan rumba), iCat Trònica (electronic music) and Xahrazad (female voices).

See also 
 List of radio stations in Catalan
 RAC 1

References

External links

 Catalunya Ràdio - Official homepage 

Radio stations in Catalonia
Corporació Catalana de Mitjans Audiovisuals
Catalan-language radio stations
Radio stations established in 1983
1983 establishments in Catalonia